This is a list of Lushootseed-speaking peoples.

 Northern Lushootseed
 Snohomish
 Stillaguamish
 Lower Skagit-Swinomish 
 Upper Skagit
 Sauk-Suiattle
 Southern Lushootseed (txʷǝlšucid aka Whulshootseed)
 Skykomish
 Snoqualmie
 Steilacoom
 Suquamish
 Duwamish
 Muckleshoot
 Puyallup
 Nisqually
 Sahewamish

See also
Skokomish people
Twana
List of Halkomelem-speaking peoples

Coast Salish